Pothier is a French surname. Notable people with the surname include:

Robert Joseph Pothier (1699–1772), French jurist and writer on contract law
Toussaint Pothier (1771–1845) Canadian businessman, seigneur and political figure in Lower Canada
Dom Joseph Pothier, O.S.B. (1835–1923), French prelate, liturgist and scholar of Gregorian chant
Aram Jules Pothier (1854–1928), American banker and Governor of Rhode Island
Albert A. Pothier (fl. 1890s) Nova Scotia Assemblyman
Lucien Pothier (1883–1957), French racing cyclist
Hector J. Pothier (1891–1976), Canadian physician and Assemblyman in Nova Scotia
Lucien Pothier (wrestler) (born 1894, date of death unknown), Belgian Olympic wrestler
Yvonne Pothier (born 1937), Canadian mathematics educator, Catholic nun, and activist for refugees
Hector Pothier (born 1954), Canadian football player
Fabrice Pothier (born 1975), French political expert
Brian Pothier (born 1977), American NHL ice hockey player
Eric Pothier (born 1979), Canadian luger

See also
Pothier House, Rhode Island, historic residence of Aram Pothier
18830 Pothier, an asteroid

See also
Potier
Pottier